Brant Miller (born February 8, 1950) is the chief meteorologist for NBC owned and operated television station WMAQ-TV in Chicago. At WMAQ-TV he is the meteorologist on NBC 5 News at 5 p.m., 6 p.m. and 10 p.m. Miller joined NBC5 News in 1991.

Career
Miller began his meteorological broadcast career as a weather forecaster at Fox 32 in 1989. As a private pilot, Miller has integrated his expertise in aviation weather and meteorological studies at Mississippi State University and Portland State University. He has obtained the American Meteorology Society's (AMS) Seal of Approval, and the advanced Certified Broadcast Meteorologist (CBM), as well as the National Weather Association (NWA) Seal of Approval for his television and radio forecasts.

In addition to weathercasting on television, Miller has been entertaining radio audiences for over 25 years. Brant was a DJ on WLS-AM / WLS-FM for over a decade before switching to television full-time.  Even before WLS, Brant was heard on KISN (Portland), KIMN (Denver), KLIF (Dallas), and WPGC (Washington, D.C.).

Miller is the recipient of the Illinois Broadcasters Association's First Place Silver Dome Awards for best television weather segment.  He also won Chicago Emmys for a weather special: "The StormTrackers", Special Children's Programming and 10 Emmys for Chicago Auto Show specials.

Charitable work
Miller continues to support the March of Dimes' fight for healthy babies, as well as other child orientated functions and charities.

Life

Raised in Portland, Oregon, Miller lives with his wife Lisa and their two sons in Wilmette. Brant is also an avid gardener, "tinkerer" and home repair aficionado.

Brant survived a bout with cancer during the 1980s.

External links
Brant Miller's biography from NBC 5 Chicago
Brant Miller's biography from WLS-FM

Television meteorologists from Chicago
Living people
1950 births